The Bièvre is a  long river of the Île-de-France région that flows into the Seine (left bank) in Paris.

Name

The name is often thought to derive from the archaic French word  meaning "beaver". However, there is no evidence of beavers having inhabited the area. Other suggested origins are a Celtic word for "mud," Latin bibere "to drink," and French , a word describing the man-made canals that carried water to mill wheels.

Course
The source of the Bièvre is in Guyancourt, département Yvelines. From there, it flows through the following départements and towns:
 Yvelines: Jouy-en-Josas
 Essonne: Bièvres, Massy
 Hauts-de-Seine: Antony
 Val de Marne: Fresnes, L'Haÿ-les-Roses, Cachan, Arcueil, Gentilly

The river enters Paris near Stade Charléty (close to the border between the 13th and 14th arrondissements), and reaches the Seine River in the Latin Quarter (5th arrondissement) close to Île de la Cité.

The Bièvre was diverted from its original course in 1148 by the monks of the abbey of Saint-Victor. This diversion is reflected in maps of Paris dating from the 13th century. Historically the river was heavily industrialized with mills, which led to the straightening of the river. Tanneries, butcher shops and dye-makers were built along its banks, leading to serious pollution concerns.

Starting in the 18th century, the river was gradually culverted. Eleven km are canalised under slabs and 5 km have disappeared under rubble and urbanisation in Paris. In modern times the Bièvre forms a rainwater system.

Restoration project
In 2003, 200m of the Bièvre was re-opened in the Parc des Près in Fresnes. At the same time, over twenty direct wastewater connections to the Bièvre were eliminated. When the river is completely disconnected from the wastewater system, the stormwater from the river will no longer flow into a wastewater treatment plant but will instead flow directly into the River Seine,
which is expected to lead to significant savings in wastewater treatment costs.

Another section of the Bièvre between Massy and Verrières was re-opened in 2006.

See also
River Fleet in London
Subterranean river

References

External links
Picture @ Home.nordnet.fr
Svbnet.free.fr
Cndp.fr

Rivers of France
Rivers of Hauts-de-Seine
Rivers of Val-de-Marne
Rivers of Yvelines
Rivers of Paris
Subterranean rivers
Rivers of Île-de-France